Day Off (Title in ) is a 2001 French drama film directed by Pascal Thomas.

Cast 
 Vincent Lindon - Martin Socoa
 Christian Morin - Agenore Esposito
 Alessandra Martines - Francesca Socoa
 Catherine Frot - Sophie
 Victoria Lafaurie - Victoria
 Olivier Gourmet - Denis Pelloutier
 Isabelle Candelier - Vitalie Rambaud
 Luis Rego - Mercier
 Anne Le Ny - Marie Pelloutier
 Armelle - Marie-Thérèse
 Katia Tchenko - Huguette Lepange

References

External links 

2001 drama films
2001 films
French drama films
2000s French films